TVRR can stand for three American railroads:
 The Tanana Valley Railroad, a narrow-gauge railroad in Alaska, operating in the early 20th century
 The Tulare Valley Railroad (its reporting mark), a small railroad network operating 1992–present in California
 The Tuscarora Valley Railroad, a narrow-gauge shortline in Pennsylvania, operating in the late 19th and early 20th centuries